The Sully County Courthouse, at Main and Ash Sts. in Onida, South Dakota, was built in 1912.  It was listed on the National Register of Historic Places in 2001.

It is a three-story Classical Revival-style stone building with a cupola that serves as a clock tower.

The building has an entablature with a dentil molding.  It was designed by W. M. Rich of the Black Hills Company, a Deadwood architecture firm.

References

Courthouses on the National Register of Historic Places in South Dakota
Neoclassical architecture in South Dakota
Government buildings completed in 1912
Sully County, South Dakota
Courthouses in South Dakota